Reg Butcher (13 February 1916 – 3 October 2000) was a footballer who played as a full back in the Football League for Chester.

References

1916 births
2000 deaths
Sportspeople from Prescot
Association football fullbacks
English footballers
Liverpool F.C. players
Chester City F.C. players
English Football League players